The 2010 South American Race Walking Championships were held in Cochabamba, Bolivia, on March 6–7, 2010.  The track of the championship runs in the Paseo El Prado (Avenida Ballivián).
A detailed report on the event and an appraisal of the results was given by Eduardo Biscayart for the IAAF.

Complete results were published.  The junior events are documented on the World Junior Athletics History webpages.

Results (both individual and team) as well as medal tables were also published elsewhere.

Medallists

Results

Men's 20km

Team 20km Men

Men's 50km

Team 50km Men

Men's 10km Junior (U20)

Team 10km Men Junior (U20)

Men's 10km Youth (U18)

Team 10km Men Youth (U18)

Women's 20km

Team 20km Women

Women's 10km Junior (U20)

Team 10km Women Junior (U20)

Women's 5km Youth (U18)

Team 5km Women Youth (U18)

Participation
The participation of 66 athletes from 8 countries is reported.

 (2)
 (16)
 (15)
 (3)
 (6)
 (16)
 (5)
 (3)

See also
 2010 Race Walking Year Ranking

References

South American Race Walking Championships
South American Race Walking Championships
Walking
South American Race Walking Championships
March 2010 sports events in South America